Minoru Tanaka may refer to:

, Japanese actor
, Japanese racing driver
, Japanese professional wrestler